Desmond Tan may refer to:

 Desmond Tan (actor) (born 1986), Singaporean actor
 Desmond Tan (politician) (born 1970), Singaporean politician